The 1916 Copa de Honor Municipalidad de Buenos Aires was the final that decided the champion of the 11th edition of this National cup of Argentina. In the match, held in Racing Club Stadium on November 12, 1916, Rosario Central won its first Copa de Honor after beating Independiente 1–0.

That year was one of the most successful in the history of Rosario Central so the club won four titles, the Copa Nicasio Vila (first division of Rosarian Football League), the 1915 edition of Copa Ibarguren, Copa de Competencia Jockey Club, and the Copa de Honor.

Qualified teams 

Note

Overview 
The 1916 edition was contested by 23 clubs, 21 within Buenos Aires Province (including Estudiantes and Gimnasia from La Plata) and 2 from Liga Rosarina de Football participating in the competition. Playing in a Single-elimination tournament, Independiente beat Gimnasia y Esgrima de Buenos Aires (3–1), Huracán (1–0), and Boca Juniors (1–0). In the semifinal, Independiente defeated Central Córdoba 2–1, qualifying for the final at Racing Club Stadium.

On the other side, Rosario Central thrashed arch-rival Newell's Old Boys 8–0 and then beat Gimnasia y Esgrima Rosario in the Rosarino zone, qualifying for the semifinal, where the squad easily defeated Argentino de Quilmes 7–0.

The final was held in Racing Club Stadium in Avellaneda on November 12, 1916, where Rosario Central won 1–0 with goal by Ennis Hayes on 36 minutes.

Match details

References

Club Atlético Independiente matches
Rosario Central matches
1916 in Argentine football
Football in Avellaneda